The Federação Paraense de Futebol (English: Football Association of Pará state) was founded on December 2, 1969, and manages all the official football tournaments within the state of Pará, which are the Campeonato Paraense and the Campeonato Paraense lower levels, and represents the clubs at the Brazilian Football Confederation (CBF). The organization replaced the Federação Paraense Desportiva (FPD), founded on May 9, 1941.

References

Paraense
Football in Pará
Sports organizations established in 1969